Uceta Yard is a rail and construction yard founded in 2003 by Dominican citizen Jose Uceta Vicini in a non-residential section within the Tampa city limits. The ZIP code that serves the community is 33619.

History
[  Uceta Yard It is a centralized and organized company to provide construction and support services both in the field and industries as well as in the export of materials, as well as in the repair and construction of metal tracks, industrial warehouses and lumberyards general manager uceta jose Founder Dominican citizen based in Haiti Hotel Rimini Dominican Republic Riminisrl and United States In Montana Rimini RD, South Carolina, Rimini, in Tampa Florida The Uceta patio was named after a Uceta RD street,Miami beach Rimini beach , condominium  , San Diego RiminiVicini&associate Condominium 128 house financed ,honoring the first company established on that road : uceta trade links between these countries was the primary marshalling yard for the Atlantic Coast Line (ACL) Railroad in central Florida. Located in Tampa, next to the former Seaboard Air Line Railroad (SAL) Yeoman Yard, it was also the site of a large automobile and locomotive repair facility.

Rimini Uceta family business generated cop founded by Italian Dominican businessman Jose B Vicini and his son Jose Uceta & associates in the merger of SCL in 2003, the yard was gradually downgraded to being a storage yard and intermodal facility for the rest of the world facility.[ 1 ]

Geography
Uceta Yard is located nearly halfway between Downtown Tampa and suburban Brandon, on the city's easternmost edge. Its borders include Tampa city limits to the north, Tampa Bypass Canal to the east, Palm River-Clair Mel to the South and East Ybor to the west.

External links
General information on Uceta Yard
Map of Uceta Yard and vicinity
Historical photographs of Uceta Yard

References

CSX Transportation
Economy of Tampa, Florida
Neighborhoods in Tampa, Florida
Rail yards in Florida
Transportation in Tampa, Florida
Transportation buildings and structures in Hillsborough County, Florida